Richard Becon or Beacon (fl. 1594), was an English administrator and  Law Officer in Ireland. He was also a political author, best known for his pamphlet Solon his follie, on the government of Ireland.

Life
Becon was a native of Suffolk, and was educated at Cambridge. Nothing is known of his parents. He entered St. John's College on 12 November 1567, and proceeded B.A. in 1571 and M.A. in 1575. Admitted a student of Gray's Inn on 19 June 1577, he was called to the bar on 27 January 1584–5. He was appointed 'her majesty's attorney for the province of Munster' on 17 December 1586 at an annual salary of little more than £17. As such he was ex officio a member of the  Council of the Lord President of Munster, although he and the Lord President were generally on bad terms. He was chiefly employed in regulating crown grants of land, and two letters on the subject, dated in the one case 17 October 1587 from Clonmel, and in the other 2 December 1587 from Limerick, addressed by him with other commissioners to Sir Francis Walsingham, are at the Public Record Office. Beacon himself received grants of land – Clandonnell and Clan Derrnott – in County Cork, and of Torcraigh in County Waterford, all of which he appears to have sublet to other Englishmen. His acquisition of land entailed the widespread dispossession of the previous owners, although this was the rule rather than the exception amongst the English colonists who took part in the Plantation of Munster. This in turn led to litigation and on occasion to armed conflict.

He appears to have been a somewhat quarrelsome individual, who clashed with many of his fellow English settlers, and more recklessly with several Crown officials, notably Sir Nicholas Walsh, formerly Speaker of the Irish House of Commons, and Sir Thomas Norris, the Lord President of Munster, who had him briefly imprisoned. He was later dismissed from office by Sir William FitzWilliam, the Lord Deputy of Ireland, with whom his relations had always been particularly bad. In 1591 the post of Attorney-General for Munster was conferred on another man, but Beacon, although no longer in Ireland, is described as the owner of land there in a visitation of 1611. By the standards of contemporary English settlers, his attitude to the indigenous Irish was relatively mild: certainly, it was much milder than that of his superior Jesse Smythes, the Chief Justice of Munster.

Solon his Follie
Beacon was the author of a political pamphlet on Ireland, Solon his follie; or a politique discourse touching the reformation of common weales conquered, declined, or corrupted, Oxford, 1594. It is dedicated to Queen Elizabeth, and is in the form of a conversation between Solon, Epimenides, and Pisistratus as to the policy that Athens should pursue towards Salamina. In this allegorical discourse, Salamina must be understood as Ireland, and Athens by England.

Beacon urges on the English government the adoption of strong coercive measures in order to eradicate Irish national feeling. The work draws on several unacknowledged sources: Jean Bodin, Niccolò Machiavelli and Francesco Guicciardini in particular; and the work of Matthew Sutcliffe on military theory.

References

DNB references
These references are found in the DNB article referred to above.

External links
 

Year of birth missing
Year of death missing
Alumni of St John's College, Cambridge
Members of Gray's Inn
17th-century English writers
17th-century English male writers
English pamphleteers